Brian Sylvestre (born December 19, 1992) is a Haitian-American professional soccer goalkeeper. Born in the United States, he represents the Haiti national team.

Early life
Sylvestre was born in Hollywood, Florida, and is of Haitian descent.

Career

Youth 
Sylvestre attended Hollywood Hills High School, and began his youth career in Florida, playing for the Schulz Academy U-16 squad, Weston FC, and at the IMG Soccer Academy. Foregoing a college soccer career, Sylvestre signed for the Vancouver Whitecaps Residency program in February 2010. In March 2010, he started for the Residency team in the U-19 Super Group of Dallas Cup XXXI.

Sylvestre was part of the IMG Soccer Academy in Florida, before moving to the Vancouver Whitecaps FC Residency in 2009.

Professional
Sylvestre began the 2011 Major League Soccer pre-season with Vancouver Whitecaps FC. He was signed to the senior squad on March 15, 2011. He was released by the team on November 8, 2012 after two years and having appeared four times for its reserve team and five times for the U-23 professional development team, but without having played for the senior men's team.

Sylvestre joined USL Pro club Harrisburg City Islanders in 2013. He made his professional debut on June 17, 2014 in a US Open Cup game against Philadelphia Union.

On February 6, 2015, Sylvestre signed with NASL club Carolina RailHawks. On May 7, 2015, he was loaned to Philadelphia Union. While on loan with the Union he started 12 games and recorded 5 shutouts. He only appeared in one game for the RailHawks that season, a U.S. Open Cup loss to the Charlotte Independence. Sylvestre took over as the starting goalkeeper for the RailHawks in May 2016 and started 19 games for the club.

Prior to the 2017 NASL season, Sylvestre trained with Croatian First Football League side Istra 1961.

On January 12, 2018, Sylvestre signed with MLS club LA Galaxy. Sylvestre was released by LA Galaxy at the end of their 2018 season.

On January 14, 2019, Sylvestre became the first goalkeeper signed by USL League One expansion team Forward Madison FC.

Sylvestre was transferred to USL Championship team Miami FC on January 23, 2020, for an undisclosed fee. After being re-signed for 2021, he was not brought back for a third season and departed after only playing in four matches.

International
Sylvestre was called up to the United States U-20 national team in January 2011 and again in May 2011 for a mini-camp in Vichy, France. Sylvestre started in a 2–1 loss against the French U-20 squad on May 19, 2011. Sylvestre accepted a call-up to Haiti's senior squad for 2021 CONCACAF Gold Cup qualification and was cap-tied to Haiti upon his start in their second match, against Bermuda.

Coaching
Sylvestre began coaching in 2022, joining the University of South Carolina-Beaufort women's team as an assistant. In January 2023, Sylvestre joined the technical staff of Savannah Clovers FC ahead of their inaugural season in the National Independent Soccer Association.

References

External links
 
 
 

1992 births
Living people
Sportspeople from Hollywood, Florida
Haitian footballers
Haiti international footballers
American soccer players
United States men's under-20 international soccer players
American sportspeople of Haitian descent
Association football goalkeepers
Forward Madison FC players
LA Galaxy players
Major League Soccer players
Miami FC players
North American Soccer League players
North Carolina FC players
Penn FC players
Philadelphia Union players
Soccer players from Florida
USL Championship players
USL League Two players
Vancouver Whitecaps FC players
Vancouver Whitecaps FC U-23 players
USL League One players
American expatriate soccer players
Expatriate soccer players in Canada
American expatriate sportspeople in Canada
Haitian expatriate sportspeople in Canada
2019 CONCACAF Gold Cup players
2021 CONCACAF Gold Cup players
Homegrown Players (MLS)
Association football goalkeeping coaches
South Carolina–Beaufort Sand Sharks
College women's soccer coaches in the United States
National Independent Soccer Association coaches